Rockford is a 1999 Indian English-language, coming-of-age drama film written, and directed by Nagesh Kukunoor. Produced by Padmini Kolhapure, the film starred Nagesh Kukonoor, Nandita Das, and Rohan Dey in pivotal roles. The film received positive reviews, and was screened at the MAMI Film Festival.

Plot
Thirteen-year-old Rajesh Naidu arrives at Rockford Boys' High School. Having left home for the first time he is a bit sad. Rajesh's best friends are Selva, a good spirited boy, and David, an arrogant sports hero but with a good heart. The captain of the school – Raja, hates Rajesh. At school, Rajesh experiences the joy and agony of living in an all-male boarding school, learning to fend for himself without the safety net of his parents. There he befriends PT Instructor Johnny Matthew, who teaches Rajesh a lot of lessons of life.

One day the school arranges a fete in which the girls also participate every year, and all the boys are to propose at least one girl. Rajesh is least interested, but goes anyway on Selva's insistence. Unfortunately, David gets hurt and cannot go to the fete. Hence he tells Rajesh to give a card to Malathi, a student from the girls school. But Malathi becomes attracted to Rajesh which David takes in his stride easily.

On Rajesh's birthday, Mr. Matthew pretending to be Malathi's uncle, brings her out of the school to meet Rajesh. This information is then passed on to the headmaster, Brother Lawrence. Shravya, Malati's friend also accompanies them. Malathi and Rajesh spends some time together, sharing their first kiss. Shravya and Mr. Matthew go together for an Ice-Cream. She then accuses Johnny of having assaulted her when they were alone, which is in fact a lie fabricated by Raja. Brother Lawrence, believing the lie to be true asks Mr. Matthew to resign from the school. Rajesh gets bewildered by this and fights Raja with the help of David, and makes him confess the truth in front of Brother Lawrence. Johnny Matthew then gets reinstated and everything ends well.

Cast 
 Rohan Dey as Rajesh Naidu
 Kailash Athmanathan as Selva Reddy
 Nagesh Kukunoor as Johnny Matthew (PT Instructor)
 Ulrika Krishnamurti as Malathi
 Imran Mirza as David Fischer
 Jayant Kripalani as Brother Lawrence
 Shilpa Pai as Shravya
 Suhail Bajaj as Raja
 Nandita Das as Lily Vegas
 Debasakti Mohapatra as Happy
 Sohrab Ardeshir

Soundtrack

References

External links 
 

1999 films
Indian drama films
English-language Indian films
1990s coming-of-age drama films
Films about bullying
Films set in schools
Films set in boarding schools
Films about teacher–student relationships
Films about sexual abuse
Films directed by Nagesh Kukunoor
1990s English-language films